María del Dulce Nombre Díaz Ruiz (27 April 1932 – 23 June 2015) better known as Marujita Díaz was a Spanish singer and actress. She was born in Seville, Spain. Díaz was known for presenting the very popular show Música y estrellas. She also appeared in the films A Cuban in Spain (1951) and La pérgola de las flores (1965).

Díaz died of respiratory failure caused by colon cancer in Madrid, aged 83.

Selected filmography

 1998: Tesoro (short film). (Spain), directed by Miguel Ángel Vivas
 1980: La reina de la Isla de las Perlas. (Spain), directed by Víctor Barrera
 1978: Deseo carnal. (Spain), directed by Manuel Iglesias Vega
 1976: El avispero. (Spain), directed by Ramón Barco
 1975: Canciones de nuestra vida. (Spain), directed by Eduardo Manzanos Brochero
 1974: La boda o la vida. (Spain), directed by Rafael Romero Marchent
 1971: Carmen Boom. Grazie zio, ci provo anch'io. (Spain, Italy), directed by Nick Nostro
 1971: Las amantes del diablo. (Spain, Italy), directed by José María Elorrieta
 1968: Flash 22. (short film (Spain), directed by Félix Martialay
 1965: La pérgola de las flores (1º Premio a la mejor película Argentina) (Argentina, Chile), directed by Román Viñoly Barreto
 1964: Visitando a las estrellas. (Spain), directed by Julián de la Flor
 1963: Lulú, El globo azul, (Spain), directed by Javier Setó
 1963: La casta Susana. (Spain, France), directed by Luis César Amadori
 1963: El valle de las espadas, (Productora Marujita Díaz). (Spain), directed by Javier Setó
 1963: La mujer de tu prójimo, (Productora Marujita Díaz). (Argentina, Spain), directed by Enrique Carreras
 1962: Han robado una estrella. (Spain), directed by Javier Setó
 1961: Abuelita Charlestón. (Spain), directed by Javier Setó
 1961: Canción de arrabal. (Argentina) Título alternativo: La cumparsita. Directed by Enrique Carreras
 1960: Three Black Angels. (México), directed by Fernando Cortés
 1960: The Showgirl (Spain)., directed by José María Elorrieta
 1960: Pelusa, (Spain) Título alternativo: La cenicienta del circo (México), Os milagres de Pelusa (Portugal). (Premio Nacional del Sindicato del Espectáculo a la mejor actriz), directed by Javier Setó.
 1959: Y después del cuplé. (Spain) Título alternativo:Le temps du charleston. Directed by Ernesto Arancibia
 1957: El genio alegre, Gioventù disperata. (Spain), directed by Gonzalo Delgrás
 1957: Ángeles sin cielo, (Spain, Italy), directed by Sergio Corbucci y Carlos Arévalo
 1956: Polvorilla, (Spain), directed by Florián Rey
 1955: El ceniciento, (Spain), directed by Juan Lladó
 1955: Good Bye, Sevilla (Adiós, Sevilla), (Spain), directed by Ignacio F. Iquino
 1954: The Fisher of Songs, directed by Antonio del Amo
 1953: Women's Town, directed by Antonio del Amo
 1952: ¡Ay, tu madre! o Aventuras y desventuras de Eduardini, (Spain), directed by Fernando Robles Polo
 1951: Una cubana en España, (Argentina, Cuba), directed by Luis Bayón Herrera
 1951: Surcos, (Spain, Portugal), directed by José Antonio Nieves Conde (4 premios del Sindicato Nacional del Espectáculo: mejor película, director, actor y actriz secundaria)
 1950: The Troublemaker 
 1951: The Dream of Andalusia 
 1949: La aventura de Esparadrapo, (Voz) (Spain), directed by Ángel de Echenique
 1949: La Revoltosa, (México), directed by Juan de Orduña
 1949: El rey de Sierra Morena, (Spain), directed by Adolfo Aznar
 1948: La cigarra, (Spain), directed by Florián Rey

References

External links
 

1932 births
2015 deaths
Deaths from respiratory failure
Deaths from cancer in Spain
Deaths from colorectal cancer
Spanish women singers
Spanish film actresses
People from Seville
Spanish television presenters
21st-century Spanish actresses
20th-century Spanish actresses
Spanish stage actresses
Spanish television actresses
20th-century Spanish musicians
Spanish women television presenters